Christopher Wyvill, D.D. was an eminent Anglican priest in the first half of the 18th century.

The seventh son of Sir Christopher Wyvill, 3rd Baronet, M.P. for Richmond, he was educated at Trinity College, Cambridge. He was ordained in 1678. He was a Canon of York from 1700 until his death in January 1710.

References

Alumni of Trinity College, Cambridge
Deans of Ripon
Year of birth unknown
1710 deaths
Anglican clergy from London
Archdeacons of the East Riding